María del Carmen Picazo Pérez (born 1975) is a Spanish lawyer and politician for the Citizens party. She has led the party in the Cortes of Castilla–La Mancha since her election in 2019.

Biography
Born in Albacete, Picazo graduated in Law from the University of Castilla–La Mancha, and is a lawyer for criminal and civil cases. She joined Citizens in 2013, and was elected to Albacete City Council as the party's list leader in the 2015 elections.

In March 2019, she received 94% of the votes to lead the party's campaign in the Castilian-Manchegan regional election in May. With 11% of the votes and four seats, the party entered the legislature as its third party. In July of the same year, she was added to Citizens' national executive body.

References

1975 births
Living people
People from Albacete
21st-century Spanish lawyers
University of Castilla–La Mancha alumni
Citizens (Spanish political party) politicians
Members of the Cortes of Castilla–La Mancha from Albacete
Members of the 10th Cortes of Castilla–La Mancha
21st-century Spanish politicians
21st-century Spanish women politicians
Spanish women lawyers